The 1903 Columbia Blue and White football team was an American football team that represented Columbia University as an independent during the 1903 college football season.

Fullback Richard Shore Smith was the team captain. Smith and tackle Tom Thorp received first-team honors on the 1903 All-America team. W. E. Metzenthin also starred in the backfield for Columbia. The team's sole loss was to the 1903 Yale team that featured seven first-team All-Americans, including Foster Rockwell and Tom Shevlin.

Columbia's sports teams were commonly called the "Blue and White" in this era, but had no official nickname. The name "Lions" would not be adopted until 1910.

The team played its home games at the Polo Grounds in Upper Manhattan.

Schedule

References

Columbia
Columbia Lions football seasons
Columbia Blue and White football